Diablo Mountains may refer to:
Diablo Mountains (Arizona) of Arizona
Diablo Range, in west central California
Sierra Diablo Mountains, in west Texas